Tapinauchenius plumipes, the orange tree spider, is a tarantula endemic to French Guiana. It was first described by Ludovico Di Caporiacco in 1954. Its previous name, Tapinauchenius gigas was based on the latin word for giant, being gigas. This tarantula is kept as pets and commonly breed.

Description 
Tapinauchenius plumipes is easily distinguished by their bright orange coloration on the legs and abdomen, carapace colored similar but lighter, females reach roughly 5.5 inches in diagonal leg span. It lacks urticating hairs and is arboreal. This species can be found in tree cavities and will often result to hasty retreat when disturbed. The eggsac will often contain 100-140 spiderlings. Females live from 14 to 18 years and males from 3 to 4 years, under proper care.

Habitat 
This spider is found in French Guiana, where the average yearly temperature is 26°C and the average yearly rainfall being 3,160mm.  This tarantula lives in the lowland rainforest of the Amazon Rainforest which are still fairly unexplored, this spider enjoys higher humidity than most other tarantulas. It lives near and in the Guiana Amazonian Park, covering 40% of the territory, the area where this tarantula is found is roughly 200m-300m above sea level.

Behavior 
As their common name may suggest, they are arboreal tarantula. Their behavior is usually described as skittish and defensive, they own a painful bite, but will usually retreat to their hide before that happens. This species also spends a fair amount of time out in their enclosure, instead of being hidden. This tarantula is not a heavy webber, only slightly webbing the entrance to their hide.

References 

Theraphosidae
Spiders described in 1954